The 2007 NCAA Division I FBS football season was the highest level of college football competition in the United States organized by the National Collegiate Athletic Association (NCAA).

The regular season began on August 30, 2007 and ended on December 1, 2007. The postseason concluded on January 7, 2008 with the BCS National Championship Game in New Orleans, where the No. 2-ranked Louisiana State Tigers defeated the No. 1 Ohio State Buckeyes  to win their 4th BCS and 5th overall national title.

For just the second time in the Bowl Championship Series era, no FBS team finished the season undefeated. Kansas was the only team from a BCS automatic-qualifying conference to finish the entire season with just one loss.

Rules changes 
After coaches expressed their disapproval of the timing changes made in the 2006 season, the following changes were made:
 On kickoffs, the clock will not start until the ball is touched in the field of play.
 On change of possession, the clock will not start until the snap.
The attempt to reduce the time of games sought by those rules was successful, reducing the average college football page from 3:21 hours in 2005 to 3:07 hours in 2006. However, the reduced game time also reduced the average number of plays in a game by 13, 66 fewer offensive yards per game and average points per game by 5.

Other rules changes for the 2007 season include:
 Moving the kick-off yard-line from 35 to 30, which matches the yard-line used in the National Football League from 1994 to 2010, to reduce the number of touchbacks.
 Paring the 25-second play clock to 15 seconds after TV timeouts.
 Team time-outs for televised games are shortened from 60 seconds to 30 seconds.
 Allowing penalties against the kicking team on kickoffs to be assessed at the end of the runback, avoiding a re-kick, also matching the NFL rule.
 Once the umpire gives the ball to the kicker, the 25 second play clock starts.
 Kickoffs out of bounds are now penalized 35 yards from the spot of the kick or a re-kick with a five-yard penalty.
 Defenders cannot use any part of a teammate to jump over an opponent to block a kick.

Conference and program changes 
The only change in conference membership for the 2007 season occurred when Temple left its Independent status to become the 13th member of the Mid-American Conference.

No teams upgraded from Division I FCS, leaving the number of Division I FBS schools fixed at 119.

Regular season top 10 matchups
Rankings reflect the AP Poll. Rankings for Week 7 and beyond will list BCS Rankings first and AP Poll second. Teams that failed to be a top 10 team for one poll or the other will be noted.
Week 2
No. 2 LSU defeated No. 9 Virginia Tech, 48–7 (Tiger Stadium, Baton Rouge, Louisiana)
Week 6
No. 1 LSU defeated No. 9 Florida, 28–24 (Tiger Stadium, Baton Rouge, Louisiana)
Week 9
No. 2/2 Boston College defeated No. 8/8 Virginia Tech, 14–10 (Lane Stadium, Blacksburg, Virginia)
No. 5/5 Oregon defeated No. 12/9 USC, 24–17 (Autzen Stadium, Eugene, Oregon)
Week 10
No. 5/4 Oregon defeated No. 4/6 Arizona State, 35–23 (Autzen Stadium, Eugene, Oregon)
Week 13
No. 4/3 Missouri defeated No. 2/2 Kansas, 36–28 (Arrowhead Stadium, Kansas City, Missouri)
Week 14
No. 9/9 Oklahoma defeated No. 1/1 Missouri, 38–17 (2007 Big 12 Championship Game, Alamodome, San Antonio, Texas)

Year of the Upset and "The Curse of No. 2"

Year of the Upset 

The 2007 season was highlighted by the remarkable frequency with which ranked teams fell to lower-ranked or unranked opponents, leading the media to dub the season as the "Year of the Upset". An unranked or lower-ranked opponent defeated a higher-ranked team 59 times over the course of the regular season. Teams ranked in the top five of the AP Poll were defeated by unranked opponents 13 times during the regular season, setting a new record in the history of the AP Poll when at least 20 teams were ranked. The only other season to see more such upsets was 1967, which was one of seven seasons when the AP Poll ranked only 10 teams.

The chaos began on the first weekend of the season when FCS program Appalachian State defeated No. 5 Michigan on the road at Michigan Stadium in what was immediately hailed as one of the greatest upsets in the history of college football. Appalachian State became just the second FCS team to defeat a ranked FBS opponent, and the first to do so against a top-five team.

"Curse of the No. 2" 
The 2007 season became known for the "Curse of the No. 2", where the team ranked No. 2 by the AP Poll was defeated seven times in the final nine weeks of the regular season:
 Stanford defeated No. 2 USC, 24–23, on October 6 at Los Angeles Memorial Coliseum. This result was particularly notable for the fact that USC was favored to win the game by 41 points, having carried winning streaks of 35 games at home and 24 games in Pac-10 play into the matchup. Both streaks ended with this loss.
 Oregon State defeated No. 2 California, 31–28, on October 13 at California Memorial Stadium.
 Rutgers defeated No. 2 South Florida, 30–27, on October 18 at Rutgers Stadium.
 Florida State defeated No. 2 Boston College, 27–17, on November 3 at Alumni Stadium.
 Arizona defeated No. 2 Oregon, 34–24, on November 15 at Arizona Stadium.
 No. 4 Missouri defeated No. 2 Kansas, 36–28, on November 24 at Arrowhead Stadium in a Border War rivalry game. This was the only such upset where the winning team was also ranked.
 Pittsburgh defeated No. 2 West Virginia, 13–9, on December 1 at Mountaineer Field in a Backyard Brawl rivalry game. West Virginia was knocked out of contention for the BCS National Championship on the final weekend of the regular season.
The No. 1 and No. 2 ranked teams had not lost in the same week of the season since 1996. In 2007 alone, No. 1 and No. 2 fell during the same weekend three times, including in both of the final two weeks of the regular season:
 No. 1 LSU lost to Kentucky 43–37 in three overtimes, and No. 2 California lost to Oregon State 31–28 on October 13.
 No. 1 LSU lost to Arkansas 50–48 in three overtimes on November 23, and No. 2 Kansas lost to No. 4 Missouri 36–28 on November 24.
 No. 1 Missouri lost to No. 9 Oklahoma 38–17 in the Big 12 Championship Game, and No. 2 West Virginia lost to Pittsburgh 13–9 on December 1.

Conference standings

Conference champions

Conference championship games 
All games were played on December 1, 2007. Rankings reflect the Week 14 AP Poll before the games were played.

Other conference champions 
Rankings are from the Week 15 AP Poll.

* Received conference's automatic BCS bowl bid

Bowl games 
Winners are listed in boldface.

Bowl Championship Series

January bowl games

December bowl games

Postseason All-Star Games 
 Cornerstone Bancard Hula Bowl – January 12, Aloha Stadium, Aiea, Hawaii – Aina (East) 38, Kai (West) 7.
 East–West Shrine Game – January 19, Robertson Stadium, Houston, Texas – West 31, East 17.
 Under Armour Senior Bowl – January 26, Ladd–Peebles Stadium, Mobile, Alabama – South 17, North 16.
 Western Refining Texas vs. The Nation Game – February 2, UTEP Sun Bowl Stadium, El Paso, Texas – Texas 41, The Nation 14

Bowl Challenge Cup standings 

† Winner of the Bowl Challenge Cup
–
§ NCAA record for bowl victories in a conference in one bowl season.
Notes
 The Sun Belt Conference, represented by Florida Atlantic University, was not eligible for the Bowl Challenge Cup as they only had one bowl berth. Conferences must have a minimum of three bids to be a part of the challenge.''

Awards and honors

Heisman Trophy voting 
The Heisman Trophy is given to the year's most outstanding player.

 Winner: Tim Tebow, So., Florida QB (1,957 pts)
 2. Darren McFadden, Jr., Arkansas RB (1,703 pts)
 3. Colt Brennan, Sr., Hawaii QB (632 pts)
 4. Chase Daniel Jr., Missouri QB (425 pts)
 5. Dennis Dixon, Sr., Oregon QB (178 pts)

Other major award winners 

 Walter Camp Award (top player): Darren McFadden, Arkansas
 Maxwell Award (top player): Tim Tebow, Florida
 Bronko Nagurski Trophy (defensive player): Glenn Dorsey, LSU
 Chuck Bednarik Award (defensive player): Dan Connor, Penn St
 Dave Rimington Trophy (center): Jonathan Luigs, Arkansas
 Davey O'Brien Award (quarterback): Tim Tebow, Florida
 Dick Butkus Award (linebacker): James Laurinaitis, Ohio State
 Doak Walker Award (running back): Darren McFadden, Arkansas
 Draddy Trophy ("academic Heisman"): Dallas Griffin, Texas
 Fred Biletnikoff Award (wide receiver): Michael Crabtree, Texas Tech
 Jim Thorpe Award (defensive back): Antoine Cason, Arizona
 John Mackey Award (tight end): Fred Davis, USC
 Johnny Unitas Award (senior quarterback): Matt Ryan, Boston College
 Lombardi Award (top lineman): Glenn Dorsey, LSU
 Lott Trophy (defensive impact): Glenn Dorsey, LSU
 Lou Groza Award (placekicker): Thomas Weber, Arizona St
 Manning Award (quarterback): Matt Ryan, Boston College
 Outland Trophy (interior lineman): Glenn Dorsey, LSU
 Ray Guy Award (punter): Durant Brooks, Georgia Tech
 Ted Hendricks Award (defensive end): Chris Long, Virginia
 Wuerffel Trophy (humanitarian-athlete): Paul Smith, Tulsa
 The Home Depot Coach of the Year Award: Mark Mangino, Kansas
 Associated Press Coach of the Year: Mark Mangino, Kansas
 Paul "Bear" Bryant Award (head coach): Mark Mangino, Kansas
 Walter Camp Coach of the Year (head coach): Mark Mangino, Kansas
 Broyles Award (assistant coach): Jim Heacock, Ohio State

All-America selections 
Selections were made by the Associated Press.

Offense 

 QB: Tim Tebow, So., Florida.
 RB: Darren McFadden, Jr., Arkansas; (running back)|Bisel]], Jr., Central Florida.
 WR: Michael Crabtree, Fr., Texas Tech; Jordy Nelson, Sr., Kansas State.
 OT: Jake Long, Sr., Michigan; Anthony Collins, Jr., Kansas.
 G: Duke Robinson, Jr., Oklahoma; Martin O'Donnell, Sr., Illinois.
 C: Steve Justice, Sr., Wake Forest.
 TE: Martin Rucker, Sr., Missouri.
 All-purpose: Jeremy Maclin, Fr., Missouri.
 K: Thomas Weber, Fr., Arizona State.

Defense 

 DE: Chris Long, Sr., Virginia; George Selvie, So., South Florida.
 DT: Glenn Dorsey, Sr., LSU; Sedrick Ellis, Sr., USC.
 LB: Dan Connor, Sr., Penn State; James Laurinaitis, Jr., Ohio State; Jordon Dizon, Sr., Colorado.
 CB: Aqib Talib, Jr., Kansas; Antoine Cason, Sr., Arizona.
 S: Craig Steltz, Sr., LSU; Jamie Silva, Sr., Boston College.
 P: Kevin Huber, Jr., Cincinnati.

Milestones 
The following teams and players set all-time NCAA Division I FBS (formerly Division I-A) records during the season:

Coaching changes

Pre-season

Post-season

Notes and references

External links